Alan Gerald Soble (born 1947) is an American philosopher and author of several books on the philosophy of sex. He taught at the University of New Orleans from 1986 to 2006. He is currently Adjunct Professor of philosophy at Drexel University in Philadelphia.

Life
Soble was born in 1947 to William and Sylvia Soble in Philadelphia, Pennsylvania.
Early in his professional career, Soble wrote papers in areas of Ethics and Epistemology. In the late 1970s he began to help articulate the fledgling specialty of the philosophy of sex, becoming one of the founding scholars and leaders of the field. In 1977, while at the University of Texas in Austin, he also founded the Society for the Philosophy of Sex and Love, serving as the society's director from 1977 to 1992; the proceedings of the Society were published in 1997 as Sex, Love, and Friendship with Soble as editor.

In subsequent years, Soble has edited or written many works in this field. In late 2005 he completed the central reference work in the philosophy of sex, Sex from Plato to Paglia.

Alan Soble was Research Professor at the University of New Orleans from 1986 to 2006.

Selected publications

See also

 American philosophy
 Roger Scruton
 Sexual ethics

References

1947 births
20th-century American philosophers
Philosophers from Louisiana
Philosophers from Texas
Philosophers from Pennsylvania
Philosophers of sexuality
Feminist studies scholars
Living people
University at Buffalo alumni
University of New Orleans faculty
University of Texas at Austin faculty
Writers from Philadelphia
American ethicists
Epistemologists